Edmund Dulac (born Edmond Dulac; 22 October 1882 – 25 May 1953) was a French-British naturalised magazine illustrator, book illustrator and stamp designer. Born in Toulouse he studied law but later turned to the study of art at the École des Beaux-Arts. He moved to London early in the 20th century and in 1905 received his first commission to illustrate the novels of the Brontë Sisters. During World War I, Dulac produced relief books and when after the war the deluxe children's book market shrank he turned to magazine illustrations among other ventures. He designed banknotes during World War II and postage stamps, most notably those that heralded the beginning of Queen Elizabeth II's reign.

Early life and career

Born in Toulouse, France, he began his career by studying law at the University of Toulouse. He also studied art, switching to it full-time after he became bored with law, and having won prizes at the Ecole des Beaux Arts.  He spent a very brief period at the Académie Julian in Paris in 1904 before moving to London.

Settling in London's Holland Park, the 22-year-old Frenchman was commissioned by the publisher J. M. Dent to illustrate Jane Eyre. and nine other volumes of works by the Brontë sisters. He then became a regular contributor to The Pall Mall Magazine, and joined the London Sketch Club, which introduced him to the foremost book and magazine illustrators of the day. Through these he began an association with the Leicester Galleries and Hodder & Stoughton; the gallery commissioned illustrations from Dulac which they sold in an annual exhibition, while publishing rights to the paintings were taken up by Hodder & Stoughton for reproduction in illustrated gift books, publishing one book a year.  Books produced under this arrangement by Dulac include Stories from The Arabian Nights (1907) with 50 colour images; an edition of William Shakespeare's The Tempest (1908) with 40 colour illustrations; The Rubaiyat of Omar Khayyam (1909) with 20 colour images; The Sleeping Beauty and Other Fairy Tales (1910); Stories from Hans Christian Andersen (1911); The Bells and Other Poems by Edgar Allan Poe (1912) with 28 colour images and many monotone illustrations; and Princess Badoura (1913).

Dulac became a naturalised British citizen on 17 February 1912.

During World War I he contributed to relief books, including King Albert's Book (1914), Princess Mary's Gift Book, and, unusually, his own Edmund Dulac's Picture-Book for the French Red Cross (1915) including 20 colour images. Hodder and Stoughton also published The Dreamer of Dreams (1915) including 6 colour images – a work composed by the then Queen of Romania.

Dulac was married twice: Alice May de Marini, American (m. 1903; div.1904). Elsa Arnalice Bignardi (m.1911; sep. or div. 1924).

After Dulac separated from his wife in 1924, he lived with British writer Helen Beauclerk until his death in 1953. Dulac frequently used her as a model for his illustrations, and illustrated her two novels, The Green Lacquer Pavilion (1926) and The Love of the Foolish Angel (1929).

Later life
After the war, the deluxe edition illustrated book became a rarity and Dulac's career in this field was over.  His last such books were Edmund Dulac's Fairy Book (1916), the Tanglewood Tales (1918) (including 14 colour images) and The Kingdom of the Pearl (1920).  His career continued in other areas however, including newspaper caricatures (especially at The Outlook), portraiture, theatre costume and set design, bookplates, chocolate boxes, medals, and various graphics (especially for The Mercury Theatre, Notting Hill Gate).

He also produced illustrations for The American Weekly, a Sunday supplement belonging to the Hearst newspaper chain in America and Britain's Country Life. Country Life Limited (London) published Gods and Mortals in Love (1935) (including 9 colour images) based on a number of the contributions made by Dulac to Country Life previously. The Daughter of the Stars (1939) was a further publication to benefit from Dulac's artwork - due to constraints related to the outbreak of World War II, that title included just 2 colour images.  He continued to produce books for the rest of his life, more so than any of his contemporaries, although these were less frequent and less lavish than during the Golden Age.

Halfway through his final book commission (Milton's Comus), Dulac died of a heart attack on 25 May 1953 in London.

Stamp design
He designed postage stamps for the United Kingdom, including the postage stamp issued to commemorate the Coronation of King George VI that was issued on 13 May 1937. The head of the King used on all the stamps of that reign was his design and he also designed the 2s 6d and 5s values for the 'arms series' high value definitives and contributed designs for the sets of stamps issued to commemorate the 1948 Summer Olympics and the Festival of Britain.

Dulac was one of the designers of the Wilding series stamps, which were the first definitive stamps of the reign of Queen Elizabeth II. He was responsible for the frame around the image of the Queen on the 1s, 1s 3d and 1s 6d values although his image of the Queen was rejected in favour of a photographic portrait by Dorothy Wilding to which he carried out some modifications by hand. He also designed the 1s 3d value stamp of the set issued to commemorate the Coronation of Queen Elizabeth II but he died just before it was issued.

Dulac designed stamps (Marianne de Londres series) and banknotes for Free France during World War II. In the early 1940s Edmund Dulac also prepared a project for a Polish 20-zlotych note for the Bank of Poland (Bank Polski). This banknote (printed in England in 1942 but dated 1939) was ordered by the Polish Government in Exile and was never issued.

Books by Dulac 

 Bronte, C. - The Novels of the Bronte Sisters, Dent 1905
 Stawell, M. M. - Fairies I Have Met, Lane 1907
  Stories from the Arabian Nights, Hodder & Stoughton, London, 1907
 Dulac, E. - Lyrics, Pathetic and Humorous from A to Z, Warne 1908
 Shakespeare, W. - The Tempest, Hodder & Stoughton, London, 1908
  The Rubaiyat of Omar Khayyam, Hodder & Stoughton, London, 1909
 Couch, A. T. Q. - The Sleeping Beauty, Hodder & Stoughton, London, 1910
  Ali Baba and other stories, Hodder & Stoughton, London, 1911
  The Magic Horse, Hodder & Stoughton, London, 1911
 Andersen, H. C. - Stories from Hans Andersen, Hodder & Stoughton, London, 1911
 Poe, E. A. - The Bells, and other poems, Hodder & Stoughton, London, 1912
  Princess Badoura, Hodder & Stoughton, London, 1913
 Stawell, M. M. - My Days With the Fairies, Hodder & Stoughton, London, 1913
  Sindbad the Sailor and other stories, Hodder & Stoughton, London, 1914
 Dulac, E. - Edmund Dulac's Picture Book, Hodder & Stoughton, London, 1915
 Mary, Queen of Roumania The Dreamer of Dreams, Hodder & Stoughton, London, 1915
 Dulac, E. - Edmund Dulac's Fairy Book, Hodder & Stoughton, London, 1916
 Hawthorne, N. - Tanglewood Tales, Hodder & Stoughton, London, 1918
 Rosenthal, L. - The Kingdom of the Pearl, Nisbet 1920
 Yeats, W. B. - Four Plays for Dancers, Macmillan 1921
 Beauclerk, H. de V. - The Green Lacquer Pavilion, Collins 1926
 Yeats, W. B. - A Vision, Laurie 1926
 Stevenson, R. L. - Treasure Island, Benn 1927
  A Fairy Garland, Cassell 1928
 Williamson, H. R. - Gods and Mortals in Love, Country Life 1935
 Cary, M. - The Daughter of the Stars, Hatchard 1939
 Milton, J. - Comus, Limited Edition Club, Cambridge 1949
 Alexander Pushkin, - The Golden Cockerel, The Heritage Press, published in 1950. Dulac wrote the version in English of Pushkin's tale used in the book.  In addition to the illustrations, he designed the layout of the book, page by page.

Gallery

See also

List of Orientalist artists
Orientalism

References

Further reading
Hughey, Ann (1995). Edmund Dulac - His Book Illustrations: A Bibliography
White, Colin. Edmund Dulac, Studio Vista 1976
Illustrated children's books: Edmund Dulac (1882-1953) by Dr. Juliet O'Conor

External links

 
 
 
 
The Kingdom of the Pearl
Edmund Dulac Collection at the Harry Ransom Center at the University of Texas at Austin
 
 
 Helen Beauclerk at LC Authorities and at WorldCat

 
1882 births
1953 deaths
Fantasy artists
French illustrators
20th-century illustrators of fairy tales
British illustrators
French stamp designers
French speculative fiction artists
British speculative fiction artists
Orientalist painters